KNCT-FM (91.3 MHz) is a public FM radio station, airing an easy listening radio format. Licensed to Killeen, Texas, United States, the station is owned by Central Texas College. The studios and offices are located on the campus of Central Texas College in Killeen.  The transmitter is located on Eagle Nest Road in Harker Heights.

KNCT-FM broadcasts in the HD Radio format.  Its HD-2 subchannel carries classical music.  KNCT-FM is listener supported.  As a noncommercial station, KNCT-FM relies on contributions and holds periodic fundraisers on the air seeking support.

KNCT-FM's 50,000 watt signal covers a large area of Central Texas, including the Killeen-Temple and Waco radio markets as well as part of the Austin market.  It has a website which includes live streaming as well as on-demand capabilities.  The station is also available on iTunes and Google Play, and can be streamed on most hand-held devices.

Programming
KNCT-FM plays easy listening music it describes as "Simply Beautiful."   The playlist is made up of instrumental cover versions of popular songs.  Several times each hour, soft adult contemporary and middle of the road vocals are heard.  From early December until December 25, the station switches to all-Christmas music, but still primarily playing instrumental holiday songs and hymns.  The station is largely automated with live hosts heard some hours on weekdays.  Also on weekdays, AP Radio news begins most hours.

History
KNCT-FM first signed on the air on November 23, 1970.  When KNCT-FM first went on the air, it aired an educational format as part of Central Texas College's service to the community.  Over time, KNCT-FM became a beautiful music outlet in response to commercial easy listening stations switching to more contemporary, uptempo formats.

In June 2019, KNCT-FM named Michelle Flores the station's new general manager.  Flores is the first woman to lead the station in its nearly 50 years of being on the air and, at 32, Flores is among the youngest women ever to take on the role of general manager at a public radio station.

KNCT-FM had a co-owned TV station, KNCT-TV Channel 46, which was a PBS member station.  The TV station signed on the same day as the radio station and served Central Texas for 47 years.  Financial pressures forced Central Texas College to take the station dark in August 2018; it was subsequently sold to Gray Television to become Central Texas' CW affiliate.  KNCT-FM's operations were not affected by the TV station's shutdown and sale.

See also
 KNCT (TV)

References

External links

NCT-FM
Radio stations established in 1970
Easy listening radio stations
1970 establishments in Texas